The following is a list of anti-aircraft defences of Australia during World War II. Prior to the war Australia possessed only very limited air defences. However, by late-1942 an extensive anti-aircraft defence organisation had been developed, with anti-aircraft batteries in place around all the major cities as well as the key towns in northern Australia. A total of two Heavy Anti-Aircraft (HAA) regiments, 32 static HAA batteries, 11 Light Anti-Aircraft (LAA) regiments, 16 independent LAA batteries, three anti-aircraft training regiments and one anti-aircraft training battery were formed. These units were equipped with a range of weapon systems including 3.7 inch anti-aircraft guns and 40 mm Bofors guns. In addition six American anti-aircraft battalions were stationed in Australia, operating in Fremantle, Darwin, Townsville, and Brisbane.

A number of anti-aircraft batteries were subsequently involved in dealing with the threat of Japanese air raids against northern Australia during 1942 and 1943, shooting down 29 enemy aircraft, probably destroying another 27 aircraft and damaging 32 between January 1942 and the end of 1943. Batteries in New Guinea also saw extensive action. However, as the war progressed and the threat from Japanese aircraft subsided, the manning of anti-aircraft defences in Australia was reduced to release manpower for other branches of the Army and for industry, and was increasingly taken over by Australian Women's Army Service or Volunteer Defence Corps personnel. Most batteries were disbanded between mid-1944 to late 1945.

New South Wales
Sydney AA Group
 103rd HAA Regiment
 108th, 110th and 111th LAA Regiments
 1st, 7th, 9th, 15th, 20th and 25th AA Batteries
Newcastle AA Group
 3rd, 7th and 18th AA Batteries
 22nd LAA Battery
Kembla AA Group
 8th AA Battery
 221st LAA Battery

Victoria
Melbourne AA Group
 112th LAA Regiment
 10th, 11th and 30th AA Batteries

Queensland
 South Queensland AA Group
 2/2nd HAA Regiment
 113th and 114th LAA Regiments
 6th, 38th AA Batteries
 North Queensland AA Group
 34th, 35th, 36th and 37th AA Batteries
 223rd, 224th and 226th LAA Batteries

South Australia
 12th and 26th AA Batteries

Western Australia
Fremantle AA Group
 2/3rd, 109th and 116th LAA Regiments
 4th, 5th and 29th AA Batteries
 66 SL Battery

Tasmania
 13th AA Battery

Northern Territory
Darwin AA Group
 2/1st LAA Regiment
 2nd, 14th and 22nd AA Batteries
 225th and 233rd LAA Batteries

New Guinea
Port Moresby AA Group
 23rd and 32nd AA Batteries
 2/4th HAA Battery
 2/7th, 234th and 156th LAA Batteries
Milne Bay AA Group
 33rd, 23rd (det) AA Batteries

See also
Structure of the Australian Army during World War II
Coastal defences of Australia during World War II

Notes
Footnotes

Citations

References

 
 

Military history of Australia during World War II
Artillery units and formations of Australia